The North West Merit League is a rugby league competition for clubs in the North West of England. It is a feeder league for the Rugby League Conference.

History

The Midlands Merit League was founded in late 2005 to support the growth of rugby league in non-heartland areas. Originally intended as a stand-alone league, support from the Rugby Football League meant that it could be administered as part of the Rugby League Conference set-up. Interest quickly gathered with 13 teams showing an interest in participating in the inaugural season - 8 eventually participated. The first ever game took place on 8 April 2006 at All Saints Sports College, Sheffield, where the Sheffield Forgers beat the Chesterfield Spires by 58 points to 8.

The league was renamed Rugby League Merit League (RLML) for the 2008 season due to its increased geographical spread with teams from the North of England taking part. 2009 saw the largest ever entry, with over 30 teams split into two leagues; "Yorkshire and Humber" and "North West" with the Midlands Rugby League becoming its own competition using merit league rules.

In 2010 the Yorkshire & Humber Merit League and North West Merit League became separate competitions.

In 2012 the North West Merit League will become the development division of the North West Men's League.

Rugby League Conference Pyramid

 RLC National
 RLC North West Premier
 RLC North West
 North West Merit League

The North West Merit League is the lowest level on the Rugby League Conference pyramid for clubs in the North West of England.

2011 structure
The following teams participated

Participating teams by season

2010: Accrington Panthers, Ashton Bears, Burnley & Pendle, Chester Gladiators A, Crewe & Nantwich Steamers A, East Lancashire Vikings, Ellesmere Port, Little Hulton Reds, Mancunians RL A, Wigan Riversiders B

Teams provided to the Rugby League Conference

2011: East Lancashire Vikings

Past winners

Midlands Merit League Championship

Midlands Merit League Shield

RL Merit League

North West Merit League

See also
 British rugby league system
 Rugby League Conference
 North West Men's League

References

External links
 Rugby League Conference official site
 North West Rugby League

Rugby League Conference